Bhakti Mandir is a Hindu Temple located in Kunda, India. This divine temple was established by Jagadguru Shri Kripalu Ji Maharaj (the world's fifth original Jagadguru) in November 2005. It is maintained by Jagadguru Kripalu Parishat, a non-profit, charitable, educational and spiritual organisation. This temple is situated on the northern side of Ganga River. 

It's life sized Divine Deities of Radha Krishna (on the ground floor) and Sita Ram (on the first floor) and Adjacent to it is a large dome.

Its beauty and unique architecture has made it the crown jewel among temples situated near Prayagraj.

History

Bhakti Mandir, meaning "The Abode of Devotion", is a divine temple established by Jagadguru Shree Kripalu Ji Maharaj in the village of Mangarh, Kunda, India.

Bhakti Mandir is built exactly at the place where Jagadguru Shri Kripalu Ji Maharaj descended to open His eyes to Grace the innumerable souls.

A stone, hand-carved temple. Standing 108 feet tall and built with pink sandstone, white marble and black granite. The foundation stone of Bhakti Mandir was laid on 26 October 1996, and was inaugurated in November 2005. 

Later, in March 2021, Guru Dham Mandir was inaugurated. This divine temple is a magnificent tribute to the glory of Jagadguru Shri Kripalu Ji Maharaj and overlooks Bhakti Mandir.

Architecture and design

This is the first temple in the world to stand on granite pillars. The architectural drawings were prepared by architects from Ahmadabad, who are renowned in Indian in the field of temple construction. This temple is 105 feet tall from the ground to the golden flag on the top of the temple. There are a total of three doors on three sides of the temple.

Like the ground floor of the main Temple, the top floor also has a round verandah and shrine. The ceiling is constructed above the second level. This temple is built of pink stone on the outside and marble on the inside, which showcases its exceptional artwork. All the outer walls are made from sandstone, which are elegantly carved. All 32 doors, the shrines on both levels, and the ceilings of the verandahs are all made from Makrana marble, which was carved with very attractive and artistic designs by Makrana craftsmen.

Beautiful life sized Deities of Radha Krishna and delicately carved Deities of the Ashta Mahasakhis (8 eternal and closest friends of Radha Rani) encircle the main hall on the ground floor. Equally beautiful life sized Deities of Sita Ram, Radha Rani and Krishna Balram are present on the first floor. Apart from the main building there are two adjacent blocks which encompass the panels depicting major life events of Shri Krishna on one side and of Shri Kripalu Ji Maharaj on the other and have carved panels depicting the divine pastimes of Shree Radha Krishna the walls outside.

Bhakti Mandir - Yugal Swaroop of Shri SitaRam and Shri RadhaKrishna Darshan

The divine deity of "Radha Krishna" in Bhakti Mandir is so mesmerizing that tens of thousands of devotees from all over the world visit and do the darshan on regular basis.
Level 1 (Ground Floor) of Bhakti Mandir is where  'Radha Krishna' idol is placed. The darshan of "Radha Krishna" in Bhakti Mandir appears exactly same as in Prem Mandir, Vrindavan. The divine deity of "Sita Ram" in Bhakti Mandir is so enticing that tens of thousands of devotees from all over the world visit for darshan.

Level 2 (Second Floor) of Bhakti Mandir is where the deities of Sita Ram are placed. In the event of major festivals like Janmashtami, Radhashtami, the Bhakti Mandir temples gets hundreds of thousands of devotees from all over the world. It is a divine gift of Jagadguru Kripalu Ji Maharaj. Similar to Bhakti Mandir, there is
 Bhakti Bhavan in Mangarh, UP, India
 Prem Mandir in Vrindavan, UP, India
 Rangeeli Mahal in Barsana, UP, India
 Radha Madhav Dham, Austin, Texas, US

Events and festivals

Holi
Guru Poornima
Janmashtami
Radhashtami
Sharat Poornima
Diwali
Jagadguruttam Mahaprayan Diwas
Bhakti Mahotsav

Gallery

References

Radha Krishna temples
Krishna temples
Hindu temples in Mathura district
Vrindavan
Tourist attractions in Mathura district